Cold Lunch is a 2008 Norwegian drama film directed by Eva Sørhaug, starring Ane Dahl Torp, Pia Tjelta and Aksel Hennie. It was Sørhaug's début as a director.

Plot
The plot of Cold Lunch has multiple dramatic threads set off when Christer (Aksel Hennie) tries to stop a communal washing machine to retrieve rent money left in one of his pockets.

Removing a fuse from the building's main power supply sets in motion a number of events affecting the lives of residents in the building.

Reception
Reviewers were somewhat split in their assessment of the film. In a review for Norwegian newspaper Dagbladet, Eirik Alver gave the movie a "die throw" of five and called it thematically "recognizable". Jon Selås of Verdens Gang gave it only three points, calling it a "uneven mix of ambitious, uncompromising will".

References

External links
 
 
 Cold Lunch at the Norwegian Film Institute

2008 films
2008 drama films
Norwegian drama films
2008 directorial debut films
2000s Norwegian-language films